Como is a rural locality in the Shire of Noosa, Queensland, Australia.

Geography

Como is mainly made up of the Great Sandy National Park.  The eastern boundary of Como follows the Noosa River and the shoreline of Lake Cootharaba.

History
Between 2008 and 2013, Como was within Sunshine Coast Region. In 2008 the Queensland Government forced Shire of Noosa to amalgamate, resulting in the new local government area of Sunshine Coast Region.  However, a vote of former Shire of Noosa residents was taken to deamalgamate and Shire of Noosa was re-established in 2014.

At the 2011 Australian Census Como and surrounds recorded a population of 791.

Heritage listings
Como has a number of heritage-listed sites, including:
 Elanda Point on Lake Cootharaba: Mill Point Settlement Site

See also
 List of tramways in Queensland

References

Suburbs of Noosa Shire, Queensland
Localities in Queensland